Elaia may refer to:
Elaia, Evros, a town in Greece
Elaea (disambiguation), any of numerous places